Fortress of Amerikkka is a 1989 American action film directed by Eric Louzil and distributed by Troma Entertainment. The movie follows John Whitecloud, a criminal rebel who's out for revenge against a corrupt Sheriff and a militia run by a crazed General. It is often cited by Troma fans as one of the company's worst films.

The director, Eric Louzil, later went on to direct both sequels to Troma's Class of Nuke 'Em High.

External links

1989 films
1989 action films
American independent films
Troma Entertainment films
1989 independent films
1980s English-language films
1980s American films